Lusaka Apex Medical University is a private university in Zambia. It was established in 2008 and has continued to provide the most modern way of learning medicine in the country.

Location
The geographical coordinates of the main university campus are:15°28'37.0"S, 28°19'50.0"E (Latitude:-15.476944; Longitude:28.330556).

The University maintains other campuses, including (a) the Foxdale Campus, along Zambezi Road (b) the Mutandwa Campus, along Mutandwa Road and (c) the TICK Campus, along Kasama Road, all in Lusaka Province.

Overview
Lusaka Apex Medical University is a leading private Medical University In Zambia. The University will contribute to the global supply of highly qualified health professionals with emphasis on Zambia and Southern Africa. Apex Medical University is a Centre of Excellence in Medical, Nursing and Health Sciences Education, Research and Specialised Clinical Care.
The university was established by 8 Zambian professionals, and was incorporated in 2008, with the objective of complementing the government of Zambia in training competent, skilled medical and healthcare personnel to serve the people of Zambia and Southern Africa.

Academics
, the university offers the following courses:
 Undergraduate courses
 
 Bachelor of Medicine and Bachelor of Surgery
 Bachelor of Dental Surgery
 Bachelor of Science in Nursing
 Bachelor of Science in Midwifery
 Bachelor of Science in Biomedical Sciences
 Bachelor of Science in Anaesthesia
 Bachelor of Science in Physiotherapy
 Bachelor of Science in Radiography
 Bachelor of Science in Environmental Health
 Bachelor of Science in Pharmacy
 Postgraduate courses
The following postgraduate courses are available:

 Master of Medicine in Clinical Oncology
 Master of Medicine in Diagnostic Radiology

 Diploma programmes
 Diploma in Nursing
 Diploma in Physiotherapy

 Pre-Medical Foundation Programme
A programme that covers Biology, Chemistry, Mathematics and Physics at A-Level education standards.

See also
 List of universities in Zambia
 Education in Zambia

References

External links
Website of Lusaka Apex Medical University
 http://www.lamu.edu.zm/programmes-offered-0
https://www.mohe.gov.zm/
https://www.zaqa.gov.zm/higher-education-institutions/
https://www.hea.org.zm/

Universities in Zambia
Education in Lusaka
Medical schools in Zambia
Lusaka
2008 establishments in Zambia
Buildings and structures in Lusaka Province
Educational institutions established in 2008